Ian Burns (c. 1939 – 6 December 2015) was a Scottish professional football right-half who played for Aberdeen and Brechin City.

References

External links
AFC Heritage profile

1939 births
2015 deaths
Scottish footballers
Footballers from Aberdeen
Association football wing halves
Aberdeen F.C. players
Brechin City F.C. players
Scottish Football League players
Banks O' Dee F.C. players
Date of birth missing